Between Five and Seven is (as the name suggests) the sixth studio album by folk singer-songwriter John Gorka. It was released in August 1996.  It is the last of the five albums Gorka recorded for Windham Hill/High Street Records before returning to the smaller, Red House label.  Gorka produced the album with John Jennings who also produced Gorka's previous record, Out of the Valley.  Unlike the previous record made in Nashville, Tennessee, the recording was done at Paisley Park Studios, Chanhassen, Minnesota and the instrumentation has been described as "more acoustic, less pop-oriented." Paisley Park is southwest of Minneapolis and is the studio designed and owned by the artist, Prince.

The album includes several lyrical portraits of Gorka's misfit characters, love songs, and philosophical musings.  The songs are also full of the wordplay for which Gorka has become known.

The album features an impressive array of supporting musicians.  Lucy Kaplansky and Jennifer Kimball add carefully placed harmony vocals to many tracks.  John Jennings also brings along several other musicians who had worked with Mary Chapin Carpenter including drummer Robbie Magruder, guitarist Dean Magraw, and pianist Jonathan Carroll.  Gorka's fellow Minnesotan Peter Ostroushko sits in on mandolin.  As with many of Gorkas recordings Michael Manring plays fretless bass on nearly half of the songs.  The tracks alternate between two different sets of instrumentalists which varies the pace of the music.  The two bass players styles are distinct enough for the listener to recognize the difference.

Track listing 
All songs written by John Gorka.

 "Lightning's Blues" – 3:54
 "Blue Chalk" – 4:41
 "Can't Make Up My Mind" – 4:10
 "The Mortal Groove" – 3:25
 "My Invisible Gun" – 2:58
 "Part of Your Own" – 3:29
 "Two Good Reasons" – 4:07
 "Airstream Bohemians" – 5:20
 "Paradise, Once" – 3:09
 "Campaign Trail" – 4:05
 "Edgar the Party Man" – 3:27
 "Scraping Dixie" – 6:27

Songs 
This is one of few John Gorka albums without explanatory liner notes which leaves Gorka's source of inspiration for these songs unknown or up to speculation.

Lightning's Blues 
"Lightning's Blues" appears to be a love song written from the unusual perspective of lightning—complete with references to forest fires, Benjamin Franklin, pressure systems, and weather fronts.

Musicians:
 Robbie Magruder – drums
 J. T. Brown – bass
 Jonathan Carroll – piano
 Duke Levine – electric guitar
 John Jennings – percussion & noises
 Jennifer Kimball & Lucy Kaplansky – vocals
 John Gorka – vocal & acoustic guitar

Blue Chalk 
The title of "Blue Chalk" refers to the chalk used in billiards.  The song introduces a pair of Gorka's characters a woman and a man.  Gorka describes the male character's addiction:

"Blue Chalk" was first recorded by Irish singer Maura O'Connell for her 1995 album, Stories.  More recently it has also been recorded by the new-England based bluegrass band, Northern Lights for their 2005 album, New Moon.  It has also been covered in concert performances by Lucy Kaplansky.

Musicians:
 Robbie Magruder – drums
 Michael Manring – bass
 Dean McGraw – acoustic guitar
 Peter Ostroushko – mandolin
 John Jennings – percussion
 Jennifer Kimball & Lucy Kaplansky – vocals
 John Gorka – vocal & rhythm guitar

Can't Make Up My Mind 
In "Can't Make Up My Mind" Gorka creates a song about indecision through a series of paradoxical statements.  Some of these are humorous in nature.  For example:

Musicians:
 Robbie Magruder – drums
 J. T. Brown – bass
 Jonathan Carroll – piano, organ, & vocals (Ooh Baby Now)
 John Jennings – the ubiquitous backpacker guitar,

tambourine & vocals
 John Gorka – 12-string guitar & vocals

The Mortal Groove 
"The Mortal Groove" is one of only two tracks not to include drums.  Michael Manring's fretless bass is featured as a lead instrument and is even given a solo.  The late winter mood of the song is like the classic "brooding" often used to describe Gorka's earlier work.  The lyrics also revisit the urban themes of blue-collar jobs and gentrification found in writing for his earlier albums such as Land of the Bottom Line and Jack's Crows.

Musicians:
 Michael Manring – bass
 Dean McGraw – acoustic guitar
 Peter Ostroushko – mandolin
 John Jennings – piano
 John Gorka – acoustic guitar & vocals

My Invisible Gun 

Musicians:
 Robbie Magruder – drums
 J. T. Brown – bass
 Jonathan Carroll – piano
 Duke Levine – electric guitar
 John Jennings – backpacker guitar & percussion
 Jennifer Kimball & Lucy Kaplansky – vocals
 John Gorka – acoustic guitar & vocals

Part of Your Own 
Apparently a song written for Gorka's mother.

Soloist:
 John Gorka – vocal & guitar

Two Good Reasons 
"Two Good Reasons" is a love song.

Musicians:
 Robbie Magruder – drums
 Michael Manring – bass
 Dean McGraw – acoustic guitar
 Peter Ostroushko – mandolin
 John Jennings – piano & percussion
 Jennifer Kimball & Lucy Kaplansky – vocals
 John Gorka – vocal & acoustic guitar

Airstream Bohemians 
"Airstream Bohemians" introduces another pair of Gorka's characters apparently living in an Airstream, recreational vehicle.

Musicians:
 Robbie Magruder – drums
 J. T. Brown – bass
 Jonathan Carroll – piano
 Duke Levine – electric guitar
 John Jennings – baritone electric guitar & percussion
 John Gorka – vocal & guitar

Paradise, Once 

Musicians:
 Robbie Magruder – drums
 Michael Manring – bass
 Dean McGraw – acoustic guitar
 Peter Ostroushko – mandolin
 John Jennings – baritone acoustic guitar, & percussion
 Jennifer Kimball & Lucy Kaplansky – vocals
 John Gorka – vocal & acoustic guitar

Campaign Trail 
Between Five and Seven was released just months prior to the 1996 U.S. presidential election, this song, however, appears to be several years older.  "Campaign Trail" is spoken from the point of view of a candidate who is apologetic, but still seemingly insincere:

At times the message appears to be of a more personal nature.  Perhaps as a touring and performing songwriter, Gorka sees parallels between himself and the politician on the trial:

Unlike the other songs, the basic tracks of this one were recorded by Eric Paul at Imagine Studios in Nashville, Tennessee.  An earlier mix of the song appeared on the EP, Motor Folkin' (Windham Hill/High Street Records, 1994).

Musicians:
 Dave Mattacks – drums
 J. T. Brown – bass
 John Jennings – electric guitar, lap steel, organ, & percussion
 John Gorka – vocal & guitar

Edgar the Party Man 
Following his own forty-sixth birthday (nearly eight years after this album's release) Gorka proclaimed on his web site, "I am now officially older than Edgar The Party Man." "Edgar" is one of Gorka's characters, a middle-aged divorcé looking for a good time.

Musicians:
 Robbie Magruder – drums
 Michael Manring – bass
 Dean McGraw – acoustic guitar
 Peter Ostroushko – mandolin
 John Gorka – vocal & guitar

Scraping Dixie 
"Scraping Dixie" is by far the album's longest track.  The song profiles yet another of Gorka's misfits, this time a war veteran working various jobs throughout the south to avoid winter's cold.  The imagery in the lyrics include lines such as, "I'll be fighting 'till they put that tree suit on."

Musicians:
 Robbie Magruder – drums
 J. T. Brown – bass
 Jonathan Carroll – piano
 Duke Levine – electric guitar
 John Jennings – acoustic guitar, backpacker guitar,

percussion, and vocal
 John Gorka – vocal & guitar

Credits 
 Produced by John Gorka and John Jennings
 Bob Dawson – Engineer, Mixing
 David Glasser – Mastering
 Fred Harrington – Engineer, Second Engineer
 Shane T. Keller – Engineer, Second Engineer
 Laura Levy – Layout Design
 Ann Marsden – Photography
 Eric Paul – Engineer
 Chuck Peters – Production Assistant
 Jim Robeson – Engineer
 Tommy Tucker, Jr. – Engineer
 Candace Upman – Art Direction
 Rudy T. Zasloff – Design

External links 
 Between Five and Seven, lyrics and samples from official John Gorka web site
 [ Between Five and Seven] entry at the Allmusic

Notes and sources 

John Gorka albums
1996 albums
Windham Hill Records albums